Events from the year 1707 in Denmark.

Incumbents
 Monarch – Frederick IV
 Grand Chancellor – Conrad von Reventlow

Events
 1 December  HDMS Justitia is launched at the Royal Danish Dockyard.
 4 December – The Danish East India Company's ship Norske Løve departs from Copenhagen but is hit by lighting on 18 December.

Undated

Births

Deaths
 19 March – Bendix Grodtschilling the Younger, painter (died 1655)

References

 
1700s in Denmark
Denmark
Years of the 18th century in Denmark